"Down" is the first single released from the debut album of the reggaeton duo R.K.M & Ken-Y, Masterpiece (2006). "Down" is sung in both English and Spanish languages. The song wasn't supposed to be a single, but due to its massive radio airplay and popularity, it became the album's second single, after "Dame Lo Que Quiero". The song was composed by Wise and Rafael Pina Nieves and produced by Mambo Kingz.

Remixes
 The official remix featured Héctor el Father.
 Another official remix was made featuring Nina Sky.
 The song has also been remixed into a more pop-style and into bachata as well as salsa.

Spanish-language songs
Spanglish songs
R.K.M & Ken-Y songs
Nina Sky songs
2006 singles
Bachata songs
Songs written by Wise (composer)
Songs written by Rafael Pina
Pina Records singles